Elias III or Eliya III may refer to:

 Elias III of Jerusalem, Patriarch of Jerusalem from about 879 to 907
 Elias III of Périgord (1055–1104)
 Ignatius Elias III, Syriac Orthodox Patriarch of Antioch in 1917–1932
 Elias III of Seleucia-Ctesiphon, Patriarch of the Church of the East in 1176-1190

See also
 Elias (disambiguation)
 Elijah (disambiguation)